Statistics of Emperor's Cup in the 1932 season.

Overview
It was contested by 3 teams, and Keio Club won the championship.

Results

Semifinals
Keio Club 3–0 Sakai Secondary School Club

Final
 
Keio Club 5–1 Yoshino Club
Keio Club won the championship.

References
 NHK

Emperor's Cup
1932 in Japanese football